So Alone may refer to:

Albums 
 So Alone (album), by Johnny Thunders, 1978

Songs 
 "So Alone" (song), by Men at Large
 "So Alone" by Juliana Hatfield, from the album How to Walk Away
 "So Alone" by Lou Reed, from the album Growing Up in Public
 "So Alone" by The Offspring, from the album Smash
 "So Alone" by Syndicate of Sound, from the album Little Girl
 "So Alone" by Ty Segall, from the album Ty Segall

See also 
So Lonely (disambiguation)